Tommy Dunne (born 27 April 1972 in Dublin) is a former footballer. He most lately was the manager of SJK Akatemia in the Finnish second division, Ykkonen.

Playing career
Dunne played for the Republic of Ireland national under-19 football team in the 1990 UEFA European Under-18 Football Championship finals in Hungary. He also played in the 1991 FIFA World Youth Championship
.

A full back, Tommy made his League of Ireland debut for Home Farm against Longford Town on 25 November 1990. In February 1991 he joined Dundalk where he stayed until 1993 when he joined Shelbourne. After 3 years he joined Derry City where he won the League Championship.

Dunne joined Shamrock Rovers in 1997 where he stayed for 5 years making 2 appearances in European competition. His father Theo won the FAI Cup with Shels in 1960 and was assistant manager at Glenmalure Park from 1974 to 1976.

Management career
Dunne managed TP-Seinäjoki in Finland for three years.

Dunne was assistant manager to Paul Doolin at Cork City in 2009.

In February 2010, he was named as the manager of Cork City.

Tommy Dunne is the son of former Shamrock Rovers Player and Coach Theo Dunne and is the first cousin of Ireland international and Aston Villa defender Richard Dunne.

On 3 August 2013 after a bad run of results Cork City released a statement reading; "Cork City FC and first team manager Tommy Dunne have parted company with immediate effect."

Dunne was appointed manager of Galway United on 26 November 2013.
Tommy Dunne got Galway promoted to Premier Division in his first season in charge and guided United to the EA Sports Cup final, losing narrowly to St.Pats on penalties.

Tommy Dunne was sacked as Manager of Galway United on 29 September 2016 after Galway were defeated 5-3 by Cork City in Turners Cross, managerless Galway United were subsequently beat 5-0 by Cork City a few days later in Eamonn Deacy Park. Galway Utd were relegated to first division thereafter in 2017.

On 30 January 2019, Dunne returned to SJK as an academy coach. He was later promoted to manager of the club's U20 team. In August 2019 it was confirmed, that also would take charge of SJK Akatemia alongside his position as U20 manager. On 13 November 2020 he left the club.

Honours

Player
Derry City
 League of Ireland (1): 1996–97

Shelbourne
 FAI Cup (1): 1996

Shamrock Rovers
 FAI Super Cup (1): 1998

Manager
Cork City
 League of Ireland First Division (1): 2011

References

Sources 
 The Hoops by Paul Doolan and Robert Goggins

Republic of Ireland association footballers
Republic of Ireland youth international footballers
Republic of Ireland under-21 international footballers
Association footballers from Dublin (city)
Home Farm F.C. players
Dundalk F.C. players
Shelbourne F.C. players
Derry City F.C. players
Shamrock Rovers F.C. players
Cork City F.C. managers
League of Ireland players
League of Ireland managers
Living people
1972 births
Republic of Ireland expatriate football managers
Expatriate football managers in Finland
Galway United F.C. managers
Seinäjoen Jalkapallokerho managers
Association football defenders
Irish expatriate sportspeople in Finland
Irish expatriates in Finland